Todd Andrew Sears (born October 23, 1975) is an American former professional baseball first baseman for the Minnesota Twins and San Diego Padres of Major League Baseball.

Amateur career
Sears attended the University of Nebraska, and in 1996 he played collegiate summer baseball with the Falmouth Commodores of the Cape Cod Baseball League. He earned third-team All-America honors from the NCBWA and first-team All-Big 12 honors in 1997, batting .421 with 17 homers and 79 RBIs in 62 games. He was selected in the 3rd round of the 1997 Major League Baseball Draft by the Colorado Rockies.

Professional career
Todd Sears spent parts of two seasons in the MLB, splitting time between the Minnesota Twins and San Diego Padres. He was called up by Minnesota on Sept. 17, 2002, hitting .333 with two doubles and three runs scored in seven contests. Sears began the 2003 season with Minnesota before being dealt to the San Diego Padres in September. He appeared in 33 games, batting .247 with two homers and 11 RBIs between the two clubs. Sears appeared in 24 games for Minnesota and drove in a career-high four runs against Boston on May 9, including his first MLB Home Run off of Pedro Martinez. In limited duty with San Diego, he batted .250 with a double and two runs scored in nine games.

Personal life
Shawn Sedlacek established Sed Sports, Inc. in 2006 with the goal of giving back to the game that had meant so much and played such a huge role in his life.  In 2013, Shawn Sedlacek, Todd Sears, and Matt Williams decided to partner and establish Complete Game Baseball to continue the growth of the organization in pursuit of Shawn’s dream back in 2006 to give back to the game.

References

External links

1975 births
Living people
Albuquerque Isotopes players
American expatriate baseball players in Canada
Asheville Tourists players
Baseball players from Des Moines, Iowa
Carolina Mudcats players
Edmonton Trappers players
Falmouth Commodores players
Gulf Coast Marlins players
Major League Baseball first basemen
Minnesota Twins players
Nebraska Cornhuskers baseball players
Portland Beavers players
Rochester Red Wings players
Salt Lake Buzz players
San Diego Padres players
Tacoma Rainiers players